Abava parish is an administrative unit of Talsi Municipality, Latvia.

Parishes of Latvia
Talsi Municipality